Donald Clark Hodges (Fort Worth 1923-Climax, Georgia 2009) was a philosophy professor at Florida State University, who wrote about revolutions and revolutionaries (especially about southern and middle America).

Growing up in Buenos Aires, Argentina, Hodges returned to the USA in 1941. He was a student of James Burnham, the author of "The Managerial Revolution," which argued that both in the Communist and the capitalist world the managers "rule the world." Hodges was a devoted (later disenchanted) Marxist and an organizer for the Communist Party and labor organizations as a young man.

Hodges earned his Doctor of Philosophy from Columbia University in 1954. He was a professor at University of Missouri, University of South Florida, as well as at Florida State University, where he began teaching in 1969. He retired from Florida State after 39 years. Hodges spent time in places like Uruguay where he met people like Abraham Guillen, an anarcho-syndicalist in the style of Bakunin. He lived more than 20 years in the Miccosukee Land Co-op. In 2003, at eighty years old, he published "Deep Republicanism: Prelude to Professionalism" in which he studied Cesare Borgia, a successful ruler, and everyone who felt inspired by Machiavelli: Jean-Jacques Rousseau, Robespierre, Babeuf, Filippo Buonarroti, Marx, Engels, Lenin, Trotsky, Stalin, Mao, George Orwell, Céline, Boris Yeltsin. Also for Hodges Il Principe is not Machiavelli's main work, but Il Discorsi.

According to one of his students Hodges "would track down original sources to see for himself if they were being cited correctly or taken out of their proper context." He rarely attended social events with his contemporaries; this was because he wanted to avoid the groupthink leftism that plagues most academic circles.

Selected works 
 Bakunin's Controversy with Marx: An Analysis of the Tensions within Modern Socialism (1960)
 Philosophy of Labor (1961)
 The Dual Character of Marxian Social Science (1962)
 Engels' Contribution to Marxism (1965)
 Marx's Concept of Value and Critique of Value Fetishism (1970)
 NLF: National Liberation Fronts, 1960–1970 (1972)
 The Latin American Revolution: Politics and Strategy from Apro-Marxism to Guevarism. W. Morrow, 1974, 
 Socialist Humanism: The Outcome of Classical European Morality (1974)
 The Legacy of Che Guevara: A Documentary Study. Thames and Hudson, 1977, 
 The Bureaucratization of Socialism (1981)
 Intellectual Foundations of the Nicaraguan Revolution (1986)
 Argentina, 1943-1987: The National Revolution and Resistance. University of New Mexico Press, 1988.
 The Literate Communist: 150 Years of the Communist Manifesto. (Major Concepts in Politics and Political Theory) (1991)
 Argentina's 'Dirty War': An Intellectual Biography (1991)
 Sandino's Communism: Spiritual Politics for the Twenty-First Century (1992)
 Mexican Anarchism After the Revolution (1995). University of Texas Press. p. 101. .
 Class Politics in the Information Age (2000)
 with Ross Gandy (2001). Mexico, the End of the Revolution. Greenwood Publishing Group, 2002. , 
 with Ross Gandy (2002). Mexico Under Siege: Popular Resistance to Presidential Despotism. Zed Books. pp. 25, 85–87, 107–115. .
 Deep Republicanism: Prelude to Professionalism (2003)
 Mexican Anarchism After the Revolution (2010)
 Intellectual Foundations of the Nicaraguan Revolution (2014)

References 

University of Missouri faculty
1923 births
2009 deaths
Florida State University faculty
20th-century American philosophers
American political writers
20th-century American male writers
20th-century American non-fiction writers
Columbia University alumni
People from Fort Worth, Texas
Writers from Texas
University of South Florida faculty